Totally in Tune is a reality series that aired on Disney Channel. The series focuses around eight students who attended Alexander Hamilton High School Academy of Music, in Los Angeles, California. The series dealt with many trials and tribulations of the students inside, and outside,  the academy. The series originally aired from June 23 to August 18, 2002. During October to December 2006, Disney Channel aired 7 minute-minisodes of Totally in Tune on DisneyChannel.com.

Episodes
"Tuning Up" (June 23, 2002)
"Concierto Night" (June 23, 2002)
"The Gig" (June 30, 2002)
"Making the Grade" (July 7, 2002)
"A Day in the Life of..." (July 14, 2002)
"Butting Heads" (July 21, 2002)
"Proving Yourself" (July 28, 2002)
"California or Bust" (August 4, 2002)
"Competition in California" (August 11, 2002)
"Tuning Down" (August 18, 2002)

External links
 

2000s American reality television series
2002 American television series debuts
2002 American television series endings
Disney Channel original programming
English-language television shows
Television series by Disney
Television series by Evolution Film & Tape